The 1986 PGA Championship was the 68th PGA Championship, held August 7–11 at Inverness Club in Toledo, Ohio. Bob Tway won his only major championship, two strokes ahead of runner-up Greg Norman, the 54-hole leader.

Heavy rains on Sunday stopped play for the day in mid-afternoon. In the final group, Norman and Tway completed just one hole of their final round and resumed play on Monday afternoon.

Norman started the round with a four-shot lead and held that margin through the front nine. After a double bogey at 11 and a bogey at 14, the two were tied. They halved the next three holes at par and were tied at the 72nd tee. Tway put his approach shot in a greenside bunker, while Norman was just off the green on the fringe,  out. Tway improbably holed out for birdie and Norman's attempt to tie missed, as did his par-saving putt. Norman led all four majors in 1986 after the third round, but won only the Open.

Entering the championship, Norman was the leading money winner on the PGA Tour in 1986, with Tway in second place.

This was the fifth major championship at Inverness, which hosted the U.S. Open in 1920, 1931, 1957, and 1979, and was the first in which the winning score was under-par; the previous best was even-par in 1979 by Hale Irwin. The PGA Championship returned in 1993.

Course layout

Source:

Lengths of the course for previous major championships:

Round summaries

First round
Thursday, August 7, 1986

Source:

Second round
Friday, August 8, 1986

Source:

Third round
Saturday, August 9, 1986

Final round
Sunday, August 10, 1986
Monday, August 11, 1986

Source:

Scorecard

Final round

Cumulative tournament scores, relative to par
Source:

Video
YouTube – Bob Tway wins the 1986 PGA Championship

References

External links
PGA.com – 1986 PGA Championship

PGA Championship
Golf in Ohio
Sports competitions in Ohio
Sports in Toledo, Ohio
PGA Championship
PGA Championship
PGA Championship
PGA Championship